Wehlen may refer to:

 Stadt Wehlen, a town in Saxony, Germany
 Wehlen, a stadtteil (quarter) of Bernkastel-Kues, Rhineland-Palatinate, Germany

People with the surname
 Emmy Wehlen (1887–1977), German actress